Badis is a genus of freshwater fish in the family Badidae found in South Asia, Southeast Asia and China. These species have a sharp spine on the opercle, soft and spinous parts of the dorsal fin contiguous, three spines in the anal fin, tubed pores in the lateral line, villiform teeth and a rounded caudal fin. In addition, they differ from the related genus Dario by being larger and displaying more involved parental care.

Species
There are currently 24 recognized species in this genus, but a comprehensive taxonomic review is necessary as some of the described species are inseparable based on available data.

 Badis andrewraoi Valdesalici & van der Voort, 2015
 Badis assamensis C. G. E. Ahl, 1937
 Badis autumnum Valdesalici & van der Voort, 2015
 Badis badis (F. Hamilton, 1822) 
 Badis blosyrus S. O. Kullander & Britz, 2002
 Badis britzi Dahanukar, Kumkar, U. Katwate & Raghavan, 2015
 Badis chittagongis S. O. Kullander & Britz, 2002
 Badis corycaeus S. O. Kullander & Britz, 2002
 Badis dibruensis Geetakumari & Vishwanath, 2010
 Badis ferrarisi S. O. Kullander & Britz, 2002
 Badis juergenschmidti I. Schindler & Linke, 2010
 Badis kaladanensis Ramliana L, Lalronunga S, Singh M (2021)
 Badis kanabos S. O. Kullander & Britz, 2002
 Badis khwae S. O. Kullander & Britz, 2002
 Badis kyanos Valdesalici & van der Voort, 2015
 Badis kyar S. O. Kullander & Britz, 2002
 Badis laspiophilus  Valdesalici & van der Voort, 2015
 Badis pancharatnaensis Basumatary, Choudhury, Baishya, Sarma & Vishwanath, 2016
 Badis pyema S. O. Kullander & Britz, 2002
 Badis ruber Schreitmüller, 1923
 Badis siamensis Klausewitz, 1957
 Badis singenensis Geetakumari & Kadu, 2011
 Badis soraya Valdesalici & van der Voort, 2015
 Badis triocellus Khynriam & Sen, 2013
 Badis tuivaiei Vishwanath & Shanta, 2004

References

Badidae